Uplands School may refer to:

Canada
Uplands Elementary School (Langley), a public elementary school in Langley, British Columbia
Uplands Elementary School (Terrace), an elementary school in Terrace, British Columbia
Uplands School (Moncton, New Brunswick), an elementary school in Moncton, New Brunswick

Malaysia
The International School of Penang (Uplands), a British international school in Penang

South Africa
Uplands College, est 1928; see

United Kingdom
Uplands School, Poole, an independent school in Dorset, England, superseded by Bournemouth Collegiate School
Uplands School, Swindon, a secondary school for pupils with severe learning difficulties in Swindon, England
Uplands Academy, a secondary school in Wadhurst, East Sussex, England
Uplands Primary School, a primary school in Sandhurst, Berkshire, England

United States
Crystal Springs Uplands School